The Miss New York scholarship competition selects the representative for the state of New York in the Miss America scholarship competition.

In the fall of 2018, the Miss America Organization terminated the Miss New York organization's license as well as licenses from Florida, Georgia, New Jersey, Pennsylvania, Tennessee, and West Virginia. In March 2019, the license was awarded to Sloane Lewis and Jamie Hickman, along with a board of directors consisting of 13 members.

Taryn Delanie Smith of Manhattan was crowned Miss New York 2022 on May 29, 2022 at the Paramount Theatre in Peekskill, New York. She competed for the title of Miss America 2023 at the Mohegan Sun in Uncasville, Connecticut in December 2022 where she placed 1st runner-up.

Gallery of titleholders
Miss New York has won the Miss America crown seven times (and is the first state to produce winners three years in a row):

 Bess Myerson (1945, first Jewish American Miss America, competed as Miss New York City)
 Tawny Godin (1976)
 Vanessa Williams (1984, first African American Miss America)
 Mallory Hagan (2013)
 Nina Davuluri (2014, first Indian American Miss America)
 Kira Kazantsev (2015)
 Nia Franklin (2019)

Results summary
The following is a visual summary of the past results of Miss New York titleholders at the national Miss America pageants/competitions. The year in parentheses indicates the year of the national competition during which a placement and/or award was garnered, not the year attached to the contestant's state title.

Placements
 Miss Americas: Bess Myerson (1945), Tawny Godin (1976), Vanessa Williams (1984), Mallory Hagan (2013), Nina Davuluri (2014), Kira Kazantsev (2015), Nia Franklin (2019)
 1st runners-up: Virginia Lee (1921), Dorothy Knapp (1922) Ethelda Kenvin (1923), Florence Meyer (1933), Joan Kaible (1954), Marisol Montalvo (1992), Taryn Delanie Smith (2023)
 2nd runners-up: Heather Eulalie Walker (1923), Kaitlin Monte (2012), Camille Sims (2017)
 3rd runners-up: Lillian O'Donnell (1941), Milena Mae Miller (1943), Leigh-Taylor Smith (2009), Sydney Park (2022)
 4th runners-up: Alice Beatrice Roberts (tie) (1924), Sonja Anderson (1977), Andrea Plummer (2002)
 Top 10: Margie Booth (1924), Edith Higgins (1925), Fern Jackson (1925), Alice Beatrice Roberts (1925), Annyse Sherman (1942), Joan Kayne (1953), Bonnie Jo Marquis (1960), Patricia Burmeister (1969), Linda Trybus (1970), Katherine Karlsrud (1971), Kelli Krull (1980), Cheryl Flanagan (1981), Suzanne Alexander (1982), Mary-Ann Farrell (1985), Helen Goldsby (1996), Tiffany Walker (2003), Christina Ellington (2005)
 Top 12: Renee Vera Hall (1935), Betty Jo Dazey (1944), Claire Buffie (2011)
 Top 15: Catherine Kennedy (1926), Ruth K. Patterson (1926), Dorothea B. Ditner (1927), Freida Louise Mierse (1927), Elissa Winston (1938), Barbara Beech (1938), Clare E. Foley (1939), Grace DeWitt (1941), Raven Malone (1947), Connie Inge Ronde (1948), Loreen Osgood (1949), Lauren Molella (2020)
 Top 16: Helen Fleiss (1937), Grace Travis (1937), Evelyn Raye (1937), Violet Mellar (1946), Eileen Henry (1946), Phyllis Battleson (1951)

Awards

Preliminary awards
 Preliminary Lifestyle and Fitness: Bess Myerson (1945), Bonnie Jo Marquis (1960), Vanessa Williams (1984), Tiffany Walker (2003), Leigh-Taylor Smith (2009), Alyse Zwick (2010), Kaitlin Monte (2012)
 Preliminary Talent: Grace Travis (1937), Marion Moselle (1942), Bess Myerson (1945) (tie), Joan Kayne (1953), Heather Taferner (1955) (tie), Sonja Anderson (1977), Kelli Krull (1980), Cheryl Flanagan (1981), Suzanne Alexander (1982), Vanessa Williams (1984), Mary-Ann Farrell (1985), Marisol Montalvo (1992), Helen Goldsby (1996), Sydney Park (2022)

Non-finalist awards
 Non-finalist Talent: Barbara Gloede (1964), Marsha Metrinko (1964), Julie Just (1965), Kari Pedersen (1968), Eileen Clark (1983), Jill Privateer (1986), Mia Seminoff (1989), Lisa Marie Molella (1990), Ingrid Olsen (1993), Brandi Burkhardt (2000), Bethlene Pancoast (2007)

Other awards
 Miss Congeniality: Violet Mellar (1946), Susan Jane Talbert (1961)
 Dr. David B. Allman Medical Scholarship: Katherine Karlsrud (1971)
 America's Choice: Claire Buffie (2011)
 Charles & Theresa Brown Scholarship: Kira Kazantsev (2015)
 Evening Dress Award Runner-up: Eileen Snyder (1923)
 Intercity Beauty Award Third Prize: Dorothy Hughes (1922)
 Professional Beauty Award: Virginia Lee (1921), Dorothy Knapp (1922)
 Professional Beauty Award Second Prize: Pauline Virginia Dakla (1922)
 Quality of Life Award Finalists: Kaitlin Monte (2012)
 Roller Chair Parade Fifth Prize: Ethelda Kenvin (1923)
 STEM Scholarship Award 2nd runners-up: Lauren Molella (2020)

Winners

Notes

References

External links
 Miss New York official website
 Crowns Amid Controversies New York Times, January 7, 2015.

New York
New York (state) culture
Women in New York (state)
Recurring events established in 1921
1921 establishments in New York (state)
Annual events in New York (state)